The 1978–79 Primera División B de Baloncesto was the second tier of the 1978–79 Spanish basketball season.

Regular season

(1) Canarias & Bosco 1 pt deducted.

References

External links
Hemeroteca El Mundo Deportivo

Primera División B de Baloncesto
Primera
Second level Spanish basketball league seasons